Buckhannon is the only incorporated city in, and the county seat of, Upshur County, West Virginia, United States, and is located along the Buckhannon River. The population was 5,299 as of the 2020 census. In 2023, Buckhannon will host The World Association of Marching Show Bands.

History
According to tradition, the first settlers in the Buckhannon River Valley were brothers John and Samuel Pringle. John and Samuel were soldiers serving in the English army during the French and Indian War (Seven Years' War) who, in 1761, deserted their posts at Fort Pitt (present-day Pittsburgh, Pennsylvania). They traveled southward and upstream along the Monongahela and Tygart Valley rivers, continuing up what is now called the Buckhannon River. John and Samuel are said to have arrived in present-day Upshur County in 1764 and took up residence in the hollow stump of an American sycamore tree. They lived there for three years, surviving off of game and fish. When they ran out of bullets in 1765, John made the journey to settlements along the South Branch Potomac River to purchase more and found out from the locals that the war was over and the brothers were no longer wanted men. After his return, they moved to the South Branch settlements. John later went to Kentucky, but Samuel returned to the river valley in 1769 with his new wife Charity Pringle (née Cutright), her brother John Jr., friends Thomas Hughes, and John and Elizabeth Jackson with their sons George and Edward. (Edward was the grandfather of Thomas "Stonewall" Jackson).

The City of Buckhannon was established on January 15, 1816, officially named for Buckongahelas (1720-1805), the legendary Lenape Chief. A statue of Buckongahelas and his fallen son, crafted by Buckhannon sculptor Ross Straight, was erected in Buckhannon West Virginia’s Jawbone Park in 2000. The city was chartered by the Virginia General Assembly in 1852, and remained part of the Commonwealth of Virginia until the secession of West Virginia on June 20, 1863 during the American Civil War. Because of its near-central geographic location, Buckhannon was long considered a prospective site for the state capital. In 1866, the legislature approved a bill including Buckhannon among the choices for capital, but officials decided the river was not wide enough to accommodate desired commerce and ultimately settled with Charleston as the state capitol.

The first courthouse was built in 1854. It served multiple functions, including as an opera house and town hall. Electricity was installed in 1891 to replace oil lamps, but the building suffered fire damage in the first six months of electrical service, eventually being razed in 1898. In its place, a Classical Revival style courthouse, designed by Charleston architect Harrison Albright, begun construction in 1899 and was completed in 1901. An annex of the same style was added in 1995. In the cornerstone of the main building is a time capsule filled with turn of the 19th century artifacts.

The Sago Mine Disaster, January 2, 2006, killed 12 and left one survivor. Officials said that a lightning strike in the coal caused the explosion. It was the worst mining disaster in the US since a 2001 disaster in Alabama killed 13 people, and the worst disaster in West Virginia since a 1968 incident that killed 78 people. National and international news crews were in the area for upwards of three days to cover rescue and recovery efforts.

Geography
The city lies in the foothills of the Allegheny Mountains. It is in the Mountain Lakes tourism region.

Climate
The climate in this area has mild differences between highs and lows, and there is adequate rainfall year-round.  According to the Köppen Climate Classification system, Buckhannon has a marine west coast climate, abbreviated "Cfb" on climate maps.

Demographics

2020 census
As of the 2020 census, there were 5,186 people and 2,084 households residing in the city. There were 2,431 housing units in Buckhannon. The racial makeup of the city was 90% White, 3.2% African American, 1% Asian, 0.07% Native American, 0.8% from other races, and 4.5% from two or more races. Hispanics or Latinos of any race were 2.6% of the population.

There were 2,084 households, of which  37.2% were married couples living together,  37.2% had a female householder with no spouse present,  21.8% had a male householder with no spouse present.The average household and family size was 2.97. The median age in the city was 37.8 years. The median income for a household in the city was $46,602 and the poverty rate was 19.5%

2010 census
As of the census of 2010, there were 5,639 people, 2,148 households, and 1,149 families living in the city. The racial makeup of the city was 94.5% White, 2.1% African American, 0.2% Native American, 0.9% Asian, 0.4% from other races, and 1.9% from two or more races. Hispanic or Latino of any race were 2.5% of the population.

There were 2,148 households, of which 22.6% had children under the age of 18 living with them, 38.5% were married couples living together, 11.6% had a female householder with no husband present, 3.4% had a male householder with no wife present, and 46.5% were non-families. 39.9% of all households were made up of individuals, and 18.2% had someone living alone who was 65 years of age or older. The average household size was 2.13 and the average family size was 2.84.

The median age in the city was 33.1 years. 16.1% of residents were under the age of 18; 25.5% were between the ages of 18 and 24; 18.9% were from 25 to 44; 22.5% were from 45 to 64; and 17.1% were 65 years of age or older. The gender makeup of the city was 47.5% male and 52.5% female.

2000 census
As of the census of 2000, there were 5,725 people, 2,159 households, and 1,180 families living in the city. The population density was 2,314.2 people per square mile (894.9/km2). There were 2,424 housing units at an average density of 979.8 per square mile (378.9/km2). The racial makeup of the city was 96.16% White, 2.01% African American, 0.10% Native American, 0.84% Asian, 0.02% Pacific Islander, 0.28% from other races, and 0.59% from two or more races. Hispanic or Latino of any race were 0.96% of the population.

There were 2,159 households, out of which 22.6% had children under the age of 18 living with them, 41.1% were married couples living together, 10.9% had a female householder with no husband present, and 45.3% were non-families. 40.0% of all households were made up of individuals, and 19.1% had someone living alone who was 65 years of age or older. The average household size was 2.08 and the average family size was 2.78.

In the city, the population was spread out, with 15.5% under the age of 18, 28.1% from 18 to 24, 19.2% from 25 to 44, 19.8% from 45 to 64, and 17.4% who were 65 years of age or older. The median age was 31 years. For every 100 females, there were 81.3 males. For every 100 females age 18 and over, there were 78.4 males.

The median income for a household in the city was $23,421, and the median income for a family was $36,975. Males had a median income of $30,691 versus $18,041 for females. The per capita income for the city was $12,959. About 15.8% of families and 24.8% of the population were below the poverty line, including 32.7% of those under age 18 and 11.2% of those age 65 or over.

Government
Upshur County and Buckhannon have maintained a Republican majority since the days of the American Civil War. On May 23, 1861 the voters of Upshur County voted 7 to 3 against secession from the United States. The majority of soldiers from Upshur served in the Union Army, while over 180 soldiers enlisted in the Confederate Army. In the 1864 presidential election, incumbent President Lincoln won the county handily against General McClellan.

The City of Buckhannon is under a Mayor-council government system.  The Mayor of the City of Buckhannon serves as a Strong Mayor. He has a seat on the City Council, which includes five additional elected council members. The City Recorder is also an official. The election of the Mayor occurs every four years in the same year as the presidential elections. By law, the City Recorder succeeds to the Office of Mayor acting as the Chief Executive in the event of the sitting Mayor's death or vacancy. The City Recorder also administers the Mayoral Oath of Office.

The City Council for the City of Buckhannon:
 Robbie Skinner - Mayor (2020 - 2024)
 Randy Sanders - City Recorder (2019-2022)
 David W. McCauley - Council Member - (2022–2026)
 Pamela M. Cuppari Bucklew - Council Member - (2016–2024)
 Jack Reger - Council Member - (2020-2024)
 CJ Rylands - Council Member - (2020–2024)
 David Thomas - Council Member - (2016–2022)

Education
The institutions of public primary and secondary learning serving the community of Buckhannon are operated by Upshur County Schools. Which is under the West Virginia Department of Education.

High Schools 

 Buckhannon-Upshur High School
 Fred W. Eberle Technical Center

Middle Schools 

 Buckhannon-Upshur Middle School

Elementary Schools 

 Buckhannon Academy Elementary School
 French Creek Elementary School
 Hodgesville Elementary School
 Rock Cave Elementary School
 Tennerton Elementary School
 Union Elementary School
 Washington District Elementary School

 Upshur County Board of Education - its website has news and events with current links to all public, county schools (K-12).
 West Virginia Wesleyan College is a private institution of higher education situated within the City of Buckhannon.

Media
There are a few radio stations and television stations located in Buckhannon. Some transmitters reach to Weston, WV, Elkins, WV, Parkersburg, WV,  Morgantown, WV, Martinsburg, WV and Clay, WV.

WBRB 101.3 FM
WFBY 93.5 FM
WBUC 1460 AM
WVPW 88.9 FM
WVWC 92.1 FM

Buckhannon is also home to a local Leased access Cable television station, Channel 3, which is available to Suddenlink cable subscribers. The station features a community bulletin board with local television advertising and events, as well as religious broadcasting and family television programming.

Notable people
 Kyle Andrews, jazz drummer
 Stephen Coonts, American thriller and suspense novelist
 Scott Munson Cutlip, pioneer in public relations education
 Alston G. Dayton,  U.S. Representative, West Virginia 2nd District
 Charley Harper, American Modernist artist
 Olive Ireland Hodges, American missionary teacher in Japan
 Weijia Jiang, White House correspondent and morning anchor for CBS News
 Jean Lee Latham, American writer
 Pare Lorentz, pioneering documentary filmmaker, with film added to the National Film Registry
 Irene McKinney, Poet Laureate of West Virginia, appointed 1994 until her death in February, 2012
 Ace Mumford, college football head football coach
 Jayne Anne Phillips, novelist and short story writer
 Kimberly A. Reed, former Chairman and President of the Export–Import Bank of the United States
 Edward Gay Rohrbough, Republican United States Representative
 Chris Wallace, general manager of the Memphis Grizzlies

In other media
 "Ballet for a Girl in Buchannon" (song cycle by Chicago from their 1970 album Chicago II; writer James Pankow misspelled the town name)
 The town was featured in the 2017 German television documentary "Auslandsjournal", as an example of the growing problem of illegal drug use in the US.

See also
 Buckhannon-Upshur High School
 Coal Mining
 WFBY

References

 https://web.archive.org/web/20070219145012/http://members.citynet.net/warner/upshur.html
 Images of America: Upshur County by The Upshur County Historical Society, pages 07, 09, and 10.

External links

 City of Buckhannon website
 Buckhannon-Upshur Chamber of Commerce

Cities in West Virginia
Cities in Upshur County, West Virginia
County seats in West Virginia
1816 establishments in Virginia